Gemmula gemmulina is a species of sea snail, a marine gastropod mollusk in the family Turridae, the turrids.

Description
The length of the shell varies between 11.1 mm and 24.8 mm.

Distribution
This marine species occurs off Western Sumatra, Indonesia; off the Philippines and in the South China Sea.

References

 Powell, A.W.B. (1964) The family Turridae in the Indo-Pacific. Part 1. The subfamily Turrinae. Indo-Pacific Mollusca, 1, 227–346
 Li B. [Baoquan] & Li X. [Xinzheng]. (2008). Report on the turrid genera Gemmula, Lophiotoma and Ptychosyrinx (Gastropoda: Turridae: Turrinae) from the China seas. Zootaxa. 1778: 1-25.
 Liu, J.Y. [Ruiyu] (ed.). (2008). Checklist of marine biota of China seas. China Science Press. 1267 pp.

External links
 Martens, E. von. (1902). Einige neue Arten von Meer-Conchylien aus den Sammlungen der deutschen Tiefsee-Expedition unter der Leitung von Prof. Carl Chun, 1898–99. Sitzungs-Berichte der Gesellschaft naturforschender Freunde zu Berlin. (1902): 237-244.
 Gastropods.com: Gemmula (Gemmula) gemmulina
  Tucker, J.K. 2004 Catalog of recent and fossil turrids (Mollusca: Gastropoda). Zootaxa 682:1-1295.

gemmulina
Gastropods described in 1902